Balintore Castle is a Victorian Category A listed building in Scotland.

The castle occupies an elevated site in moorland above Balintore village, a few miles north of the Loch of Lintrathen, near Kirriemuir, Angus. A tower house named Balintor existed on the site in the late 16th century, according to Timothy Pont's maps.

It was designed in 1859 by the architect William Burn. A typical example of the Scottish Baronial style, it features an abundance of turreted towers and gables, and a gone oriel window. The main tower is topped by a balustraded viewing platform similar to that of Buchanan Castle.

The centrepiece of the interior is the great hall, and there is also a gallery, bedrooms, dinner service room, women servant's sitting room, brushing room, beer cellar, lumber room, butler's pantry, dining room, and a library.

Balintore Castle was commissioned as a sporting lodge by David Lyon, MP, who had inherited a fortune made by his family through investments in the East India Company. Latterly the castle was used only during the shooting season.

In the 1960s it was decided not to repair the extensive dry rot, and it was abandoned. The castle then stood empty until 2007, during which time its condition deteriorated to point of endangering the structure. Balintore Castle has been listed in the Buildings at Risk Register for Scotland since it started in 1990. Angus Council used its compulsory purchase powers to buy it from its absentee Far Eastern owners, and it is now in the hands of a Scotsman who is restoring it and residing there.

References

External links
Balintore Castle at Geograph British Isles
Balintore Castle Restoration Project
Balintore Castle Restoration Project Blog
Balintore Castle Holiday Accommodation Site

Houses completed in 1859
Category A listed buildings in Angus, Scotland
Castles in Angus, Scotland
Listed houses in Scotland